Birlinn Limited is an independent publishing house based in Edinburgh, Scotland. It was established in 1992 by managing director Hugh Andrew.

Imprints
Birlinn Limited is composed of a number of imprints, including:

Birlinn, which publishes Scottish interest books, from biography to history, military history and Scottish Gaelic. (Its name comes from the old Norse word , meaning a long boat or small galley with 12 to 18 oars, used especially in the Hebrides and West Highlands of Scotland in the Middle Ages.)
Polygon Books, which publishes literary fiction and poetry, both classic and modern, from Scottish writers such as Robin Jenkins, George Mackay Brown, and the author of The No. 1 Ladies' Detective Agency, Alexander McCall Smith. It was founded in the late 1960s by students of the University of Edinburgh.
Mercat Press, founded in 1970 and acquired by Birlinn in 2007, which publishes walking and climbing guides. (Mercat is the Scots language word for "market" or "trade".)
John Donald, publishing academic books about Scotland.

Notable authors and works
 Alexander McCall Smith
 Love in the Time of Bertie (2021)
 The People's City (2022)
 Martin C. Strong
 The Great Folk Discography, Vol. 1: Pioneers & Early Legends (2010)
 The Great Folk Discography, Vol. 2: The Next Generation (2011)
 Andy Wightman
 The Poor Had No Lawyers (Third Edition, 2015)

References

External links 
Birlinn

Book publishing companies of Scotland
Companies based in Edinburgh
Publishing companies established in 1992
Scottish brands
1992 establishments in Scotland